Branislav Vićentić (born July 5, 1971) is a Serbian basketball coach and former player.

Playing career 
Vićentić played for Yugoslav teams OKK Beograd, Bobanik and Beobanka. In 1998, he moved to Poland where he played for AZS Lublin for two seasons. After stint in Poland, he moved to Lokomotiv-Kuban, and later to UNICS.

In 2002, Vićentić signed for Bulgarian team Yamolgaz '92 Yambol. Later he moved to CSKA Sofia. During 2005–06 season he played for Apollon Limassol of the Cyprus League. In 2006, Vićentić came back to Serbia and spent one season playing for Mega Ishrana before retirement in March 2007.

Coaching career 
Vićentić was a coach for Crvena zvezda youth selections before got promoted to an assistant coach for Crvena zvezda. He coached the Mega Vizura youth selections from 2012 to 2014.

In December 2013, Vićentić was hired as the under-16 and under-18 Bahrain national team basketball coach. He left the program in August 2014

In November 2015, Vićentić signed for Bosnian team Radnik Bijeljina. He resigned in April 2018.

In June 2018, he became the head coach for OKK Beograd of the Basketball League of Serbia. OKK Beograd and Vićentić mutually parted ways after a successful season.

In June 2020, Vićentić became a head coach for San-en NeoPhoenix of the Japanese B.League.

Career achievements 
As player
 Yugoslav Cup winner: 1 (with OKK Beograd: 1992–93)
 Bulgarian Cup winner: 1 (with CSKA Sofia: 2004–05)

References

External links
 Coach Profile at eurobasket.com
 Player Profile at balkanleague.net
 Player Profile at eurobasket.com

1971 births
Living people
Apollon Limassol BC players
Basketball players from Belgrade
Basketball League of Serbia players
BC CSKA Sofia players
BC UNICS players
BC Yambol players
KK Beobanka players
KK Crvena zvezda assistant coaches
KK Crvena zvezda youth coaches
KK Mega Basket players
KK Radnik Bijeljina coaches
KK Sloga players
OKK Beograd coaches
OKK Beograd players
San-en NeoPhoenix coaches
PBC Lokomotiv-Kuban players
Serbian men's basketball coaches
Serbian men's basketball players
Serbian expatriate basketball people in Bahrain
Serbian expatriate basketball people in Bosnia and Herzegovina
Serbian expatriate basketball people in Bulgaria
Serbian expatriate basketball people in Cyprus
Serbian expatriate basketball people in Poland
Serbian expatriate basketball people in Russia
Serbian expatriate basketball people in Japan
Serbian expatriate basketball people in Estonia
Power forwards (basketball)